The U.S. Women's Mid-Amateur is one of thirteen United States Golf Association national championships.  First played in 1987, it provides amateur women over the age of 25 an opportunity to compete for a national championship. Entrants must have a handicap index of 9.4 or lower.

The major amateur tournament in the U.S. for women, the U.S. Women's Amateur, is dominated by women under age 25, many with hopes of becoming tournament professionals.

The winner wins an invitation to the U.S. Women's Open, and if she will turn 50 by the time of the ensuing U.S. Senior Women's Open, she is automatically eligible for that tournament.

Winners

Source

^ Originally scheduled for Quail Creek Country Club in Naples, Florida but moved due to course damage caused by Hurricane Irma.

Multiple winners
4 wins: Ellen Port, Meghan Bolger Stasi
3 wins: Sarah LeBrun Ingram
2 wins: Carol Semple Thompson, Julia Potter

Future sites

Source

References

External links

Amateur golf tournaments in the United States
Women's golf tournaments in the United States
Women's Mid-Amateur